The Santa Bárbara Military Cathedral is a colonial Eclectic Catholic cathedral dedicated to Saint Barbara that is located in the Ciudad Colonial of Santo Domingo, in the Dominican Republic. Its official name is Santa Iglesia Catedral Castrense Santa Bárbara de los Hombres de la Mar (Cathedral Military Saint Church Saint Barbara of the Men of the Sea). It is located in the Santa Bárbara de los Hidalgos Canteros sector, at the intersection of calle Isabel La Católica with calle General Gabino Puello, right on the edge of the Wall that protected the first Spanish viceroyalty in the New World.

History

The Santa Bárbara church, seat of the Military Bishopric of the Dominican Republic. It was built on the same land where the workers extracted the stones for the construction of the Cathedral, the Alcázar, the Fortress, the various houses and colonial institutions.

In 1537 a structure was built in palm and straw boards, where the workers went to pray and meet. It remained that way for almost 30 years until a cyclone destroyed the fragile building. In 1562 it began to be raised in on the quarry from which they were extracted.

It suffered several earthquakes, in 1571, 1673 and 1684, which required its intervention and reconstruction. In addition, during Sir Francis Drake's looting of the city of Santo Domingo in 1586, it was affected by a fire.

On July 12, 1772, Pope Clement XIV decreed that the church become an Ecclesiastical asylum. Santa Bárbara was also a cemetery and mass grave for the plagues that occurred on the island, where the remains of Canon Benito Díaz Páez rest and became a sanctuary for sailors.

Both the church and its square were the scene of the first years of life of Juan Pablo Duarte, father of the Dominican homeland. On February 4, 1813, he was baptized there, just a few days old.

Santa Bárbara was declared a World Heritage Site by the United Nations Educational, Scientific and Cultural Organization (UNESCO) in 1990.

Restoration
After more than eight years closed to the public due to the bad conditions in which it was found in several parts, in January 2014 the Dominican government began renovation work by the Office of Supervising Engineers of State Works. The restoration included the consolidation, cleaning and rescue of the walls and arches, the recovery of the vaults and the repair of the ceiling with original bricks. An amphitheater with capacity for 600 seated people was also built in the back.

The works were completed on December 19, 2019, the day it was delivered restored.

Description and discoveries
Inside, the nave of the church has eight late-Gothic chapels and a Baroque-style tabernacle. The bells of Santa Bárbara originally belonged to the church of the Monastery of San Francisco.

Due to the fires and earthquakes suffered during the colony, the architectural style of Santa Bárbara is in itself Eclectic, essentially presenting the Spanish colonial style with certain Baroque, Gothic and Renaissance details. It is also notable for two colonial unequal towers and three brick arches.

The Santa Bárbara church is full of frescoes and offerings brought by many sailors and merchants who arrived at the port of Santo Domingo. The floors were brought from Genoa.

In February 2019, the remains of Ana María Duarte, sister of Juan Pablo Duarte, who died when she was not yet two years old, were identified in the church. It consists of this in the General Archive of the Indies that she was buried in the Chapel of Nuestra Señora del Rosario on October 9, 1816.

The patrons of the military forces have been crowned on its altar: the Virgen del Amparo venerated by the Dominican Navy, while the Air Force venerates Our Lady del Carmen, the Army Archangel Saint Michael, and the National Police Saint Jude the Apostle.

See also 

List of colonial buildings in Santo Domingo

References

Roman Catholic churches in Santo Domingo
Roman Catholic churches completed in 1684
Spanish Colonial architecture in the Dominican Republic
1537 establishments in the Spanish Empire
Eclectic architecture
Ciudad Colonial (Santo Domingo)
Roman Catholic cathedrals in the Dominican Republic